"Burnin'" is a 1997 song by Anders Melander first released by Swedish music group Cue. The song was awarded a Grammis for "Song of the year 1997", which was the first time a song performed in another language than Swedish won this award. The song was featured on the band's self-titled album which was released in 2000.

French Canadian singer Garou covered the song for his 2008 album Piece of My Soul.

History 
Anders Melander was a composer working for the Swedish TV and a theatre director at Angeredsteatern. He was also much earlier a member in the progg band Nationalteatern. Niklas Hjulström on the other hand was an actor. The two had cooperated before working on a song and Anders knew Hjulström was a skilled singer. So when Anders needed a singer to sing "Burnin'", a song composed by him for the Swedish TV series Glappet, he asked Hjulström and they formed together a band called Cue.

Although not strictly intended for release as a hit, just usage for the TV series, the song gained popularity and upon release as the first single for Cue, it hit the Swedish charts at #1 for 4 weeks (14 November to 12 December 1997. It eventually sold 90,000 copies making it one of the most successful singles in the 1990s in Sweden. It also reached #4 in Norway and #9 in Finland.

Chart performance

Weekly charts

Year-end charts

References 

1997 songs
Swedish pop songs
English-language Swedish songs